RB Link is a separate airline brand owned by Royal Brunei Airlines under a joint partnership with Malindo Air. Royal Brunei Airlines uses this brand to operate regional flights around Borneo, particularly to cities in Malaysia and Indonesia. It uses the same IATA code as Royal Brunei Airlines with its base also at Brunei International Airport. All of its aircraft, maintenance, insurance and staff will be provided by Malindo Air however the service and amenities onboard will be provided by Royal Brunei Airlines. The staff will also be trained to Royal Brunei Airlines service standards.

RB Link began its first flight on 29 July 2019 to Kota Kinabalu. It started with two brand new ATR 72-600 aircraft, operated by Malindo Air, to begin services.

In March 2020, the airline announced that it will temporary suspended its operation due to the coronavirus pandemic, border restrictions and the declining travel demand and consequently RB Link re-meged back to Royal Brunei Airlines.

Destinations
As of June 2020, RB Link operates to the following destinations:

Fleet
As of July 2019, the RB Link fleet consists of the following ATR aircraft. All of its aircraft belong to, and are operated by Malindo Air.

References

Airlines of Brunei
Airlines established in 2019
Lion Air
Royal Brunei Airlines